Haplophyllum patavinum, commonly known as rue of Padua, is an ornamental plant in the citrus family, Rutaceae.

References

 

patavinum
Plants described in 1753
Taxa named by Carl Linnaeus